Busan IPark is a South Korean football club based in Busan. During the 2014/15 campaign they will be competing in the K League Classic and the Korean FA Cup.

K League Classic

External links
  Official website
  Facebook
  Twitter
  Official Supporters : P.O.P(Pride Of Pusan)
 Busan IPark at ROKfootball.com

Busan IPark
Busan IPark seasons